John Heymans (born on January 9, 1998) is a Belgian track & field athlete specialised in long distance and cross country. He has won two national titles (3000m indoor and cross country in 2021). His favourite distances are the 1500m, 3000m and 5000m. Heymans is also an accomplished cross country runner. He is a member of Daring Club Leuven Atletiek. After finishing his MSc in Bioengineering and Nanotechnology from the Katholieke Universiteit Leuven in September 2022, he decided to become a professional athlete.

Life 
John Heymans was born in Vilvoorde, Belgium on January 9, 1998. He grew up in the town of Rossem, province of Flemish-Brabant.
As a teenager Heymans played national-level hockey but took up competitive running in 2016. In his first year in college he combined both sports, but soon decided to focus completely on running. 

On December 10, 2017, at the age of 19, Heymans participated as a junior in the European Cross Country Championships in Samorín, Slovakia. He finished 24th, 31 seconds behind winner Jakob Ingebrigtsen from Norway. Team Belgium got 4th place in the Junior team ranking that year.

In 2019, John Heymans returned to the European Cross Country Championships, held on December 8, 2019 in Lisboa, Portugal. He finished in 24th position in the U-23 race, 1'13" behind winner Jimmy Gressier from France. Team Belgium ranked 6th in the U-23 category.
On August 16, 2020, Heymans finished 6th in the 1500m at the Belgian National Championships in Brussel, Belgium in a time of 3:51.51.

John Heymans took his first national title on February 20, 2021, when he won the 3000m race at the Belgian National Indoor Championships in 7:51.57. With his winning time Heymans qualified for the European Championships in Torun, Poland, where he finished 7th in the heats in a time of 7:58.13.

Only one week later, on February 28, 2021, Heymans won his second national title at the Belgian National Championships cross country in Laken, Belgium.

Heymans had a difficult 2021 season with stress fractures and COVID-19 infections. Nevertheless, without much preparation Heymans managed to place 6th at the 2022 Belgian National Cross Country Championships in Brussels on March 6, 2022.

Turning professional in 2022 

After he finished his studies in September 2022, Heymans decided to start pursuing his dream of competing in the Olympics by living and training like a professional.

Heymans returned to the European Cross Country Championships in Torino, Italy on December 11, 2022. In the first couple of laps, Heymans stayed close to the front runners. In the middle part of the race Heymans lost a bit of terrain, but came back strong in the final lap, passing three competitors to finish in 14th place, his best European Cross Country Championships ranking up to that date. Team Belgium ranked 4th in the teams competition.

2022 - 2023 Indoor Season 

- On 5 February 2023 at the IFAM Gent Indoor in the Topsporthal Vlaanderen, Gent (BEL), Heymans ran an intelligent and aggressive race to finish second in a time of 7:45.48, six seconds faster than his personal best from 2021.

- At the Meeting Metz Moselle Athlelor on 11 February 2023, Heymans finished third in 7:42.55 beating his best from the week before by another three seconds. With this time, Heymans qualified for the 2023 European Indoor Championships to be held from 2 to 5 March 2023 at the Ataköy Arena in Istanbul.

Personal Bests 

Outdoor

• 1500 meters:  3:49.10  (Boudewijnstadion, Brussels, Belgium), 09 AUG 2020

• 3000 meters:  7:57.25  (Domein Drie Fonteinen Piste, Vilvoorde, Belgium), 30 AUG 2020

• 5000 meters: 13:42.84  (Stadion De Veen, Heusden-Zolder, Belgium), 06 SEP 2020

Indoor

• 3000 Metres:  7:42.55  (L'Anneau-Halle d'athlétisme de Metz, Metz (France), 11 FEB 2023

References 

1998 births
Living people
Belgian male middle-distance runners
Belgian male cross country runners